The steamboat L.T. Haas was a vessel that operated on Lake Washington in the first part of the 20th century.

Construction
L.T. Haas was built in 1902 by G.V. Johnson, who owned an early shipyard on Lake Washington.

Operating career
L.T. Haas, rated at 89 tons, was originally operated by Harry Cade and the Carlson Brothers, who, doing business as the Interlaken Steamship Company, ran her on the Leschi Park-Meydenhauer Bay route. Later Captain John Anderson of Anderson Steamboat Co. acquired L.T. Haas when he merged the Interlaken concern into his own company.  L.T. Haas was destroyed by fire in 1909 while on the lake.

See also
Steamboats of Lake Washington
Puget Sound Mosquito Fleet

Notes

External links

Historic images from on-line collections of the University of Washington
profile view of L.T. Haas
steamer, probably L.T. Haas, at Lakewood dock, 1902
L.T. Hass at unimproved landing

Steamboats of Lake Washington
Propeller-driven steamboats of Washington (state)
Ships built at Lake Washington Shipyard
1902 ships